The 1820 Pennsylvania gubernatorial election occurred on October 10, 1820. Incumbent Democratic-Republican governor William Findlay sought re-election but was defeated by U.S. Representative Joseph Hiester. Findlay entered the race with significantly reduced popularity. He had been renounced in the press as an opponent of democracy due to his nomination during the 1817 campaign by a group of party insiders. He additionally faced allegations of corruption over the misappropriation of funds during his tenure as State Treasurer, although all charges were dismissed during impeachment proceedings before the State Legislature.  For this campaign, Findlay was nominated at a popular convention of Democratic Republicans; Hiester was selected at a separate convention of Federalists and "Old School Democrats" (i.e. allies of former governor Thomas McKean). The sour state of the economy was a key factor in the defeat of the incumbent, as Pennsylvania was reeling from the effects of the Panic of 1819.

Results

References

1820
Pennsylvania
Gubernatorial
November 1820 events